Michael R. Wilson (born February 26, 1975) is a Canadian former  professional ice hockey defenceman. Wilson was drafted 20th overall by the Vancouver Canucks in the 1993 NHL Entry Draft. He played 336 career NHL games, scoring 16 goals and 41 assists for 57 points.

Playing career
Between 1995 and 2003, Wilson played 336 games in the National Hockey League (NHL) with the Buffalo Sabres, Florida Panthers, Pittsburgh Penguins, and New York Rangers. Wilson played the next two seasons in Europe splitting time between Norway, Finland, Switzerland and Austria. Wilson subsequently returned to hockey late in the 2008-09 Season to play for the Trenton Devils of the ECHL. He was given the opportunity by a friend who worked within the organization. He played the final five games of the regular season and the first round of the playoffs, with the team losing in the first round. Wilson returned to the ECHL late in the following season with the Toledo Walleye, again playing a small number of regular season games but no playoff games. He would continue this trend the following season with the games that he played at the end of the regular season being the last of his playing career.

During the 2004–05 season Wilson played for the Storhamar Dragons of the Norwegian UPC league, scoring one goal and two assists in 23 regular season and playoff games.

Career statistics

Personal life
Wilson resides in Independence, Ohio with his family.

References

External links

1975 births
Living people
Buffalo Sabres players
Canadian ice hockey defencemen
EHC Basel players
EHC Black Wings Linz players
Florida Panthers players
Hartford Wolf Pack players
Ice hockey people from Ontario
Ilves players
Las Vegas Thunder players
Louisville Panthers players
National Hockey League first-round draft picks
New York Rangers players
Pittsburgh Penguins players
Rochester Americans players
Sportspeople from Brampton
Springfield Falcons players
Storhamar Dragons players
Sudbury Wolves players
Toledo Walleye players
Trenton Devils players
Vancouver Canucks draft picks
Wilkes-Barre/Scranton Penguins players
Canadian expatriate ice hockey players in Austria
Canadian expatriate ice hockey players in Norway
Canadian expatriate ice hockey players in Finland
Canadian expatriate ice hockey players in Switzerland